Battle Arena Toshinden 2 is a weapon based 3D fighting game developed by Tamsoft. It was released for the PlayStation and arcades in 1995, with the arcade version published by Capcom, followed by a port to PC. It is the sequel to Battle Arena Toshinden, and was a departure from the usual fighting game formula in that it was developed for home console first, with the arcade version being developed later. In some countries the arcade version was also released after the PlayStation version.

Battle Arena Toshinden URA (full title Ultimate Revenge Attack) is a Sega Saturn specific sequel to Toshinden Remix (aka Toshinden S).

Gameplay
The core gameplay remains unchanged from the original Battle Arena Toshinden, but the game does include a simple combo system. The 3D movement was also altered to create slightly better balance in battle; differentiating from the first game, dodge rolling will no longer make the character temporarily immune to the opponent's attack (in the first game, it was possible for a character to dodge straight through even the most deadly attacks). As in the first game, a player falling out of the ring will result in a ring out, only this time, if both players fall out of the ring at the same time, the one who falls out last will be declared the winner.

Plot

Battle Arena Toshinden 2
Following the discovery of his treachery, Gaia has been branded a traitor and marked for death by Uranus and Master, the other leaders of the Secret Society, who hold another Battle Arena Toshinden tournament in order to lure him out so that he can be swiftly eliminated by them and their loyal forces. In a complete state of personal desperation, Gaia turns to the previous tournament's fighters for help in having to overthrow his former allies, unaware that the entire situation is a deadly trap/scheme orchestrated by Uranus as she personally seeks to eliminate all who stands in her ambitious way of overthrowing Master and taking the Secret Society for herself.

As in the previous tournament, Eiji Shinjo advances to the finals and manages to defeat both Uranus and Master in battle, and even though he is still unable to locate his long-lost older brother Sho, a series of clues are left behind that may lead Eiji to Sho from within the near future. With the deaths of both Uranus and Master, it seems that the Secret Society has been crushed once and for all. However, unbeknownst to the participants, the tournament has secretly been observed through the eyes of the mysterious Vermilion, an agent for the Secret Society's long-time rival criminal group, the Organization, who start to put their own plan for the fighters in motion.

Toshinden URA
Sometime after the events of the first Toshinden game, a police scientist named Ronron creates an android fighter intended for law enforcement, its name being the Replicant. To make the android as strong as possible, its fighting abilities are patterned off the world's greatest fighter, Sho Shinjo. The prototype is later stolen just before it can be fully completed. Within time, someone begins murdering famous fighters around the world in a surprising yet shocking manner. With no evidence as to who is behind these murders, the Toshinden fighters grow suspicious of each other. Meanwhile, a mysterious man, known only as Ripper, is seeking Sho Shinjo as his sister (believed to have been Cupido) has disappeared without a trace and Ripper himself believes that Sho may have killed her from within the past. Every lead Ripper finds takes him to the scene of one of these mysterious murders, leading to him becoming the prime suspect in a shrouded conspiracy that seems to be surrounding him and the rest of the Toshinden fighters.

Release
Though based on the original version of Battle Arena Toshinden 2, Battle Arena Toshinden URA has altered gameplay, making it feel notably different. It also has all new arenas, a new story, a different CG intro, new rendered cinemas, and four exclusive new characters (Ripper, Ronron, Replicant and Wolf) that replace four of the original version's characters (Gaia, Chaos, Uranus and Master). Though within the game "URA" is an abbreviation, the word "Ura" also has combat connotations in Japanese.

Toshinden 2 was ported to the PC. It is a Windows port of the PlayStation version with arcade graphical fidelity, the ability to play the game in higher resolutions and some additional options, such as the ability to remap all the controls (the PlayStation version only allows the remapping of the shoulder buttons). Unlike the original PlayStation version, it also saves unlocked characters, settings and results, but the introductory movie was removed.

Reception

Commercial performance
In Japan,  magazine listed Battle Arena Toshinden 2 on their February 1, 1996 issue as being the tenth most successful arcade game of the month.

On the PlayStation, the game sold 435,712 units in Japan. In the United States, it sold 133,491 units, for a total of  units sold in Japan and the United States.

Battle Arena Toshinden URA for the Saturn sold 13,432 units during its first week in Japan. This adds up to a combined total of at least  units sold for home consoles in Japan and the United States.

Reviews
In reviews for Battle Arena Toshinden 2, critics generally commented that the game is good but shows little improvement over its predecessor and fails to measure up to marketplace competitors like Virtua Fighter 2 and Tekken 2. The four reviewers of Electronic Gaming Monthly had a more positive reaction than most, praising the graphics and the new character Vermillion, while remarking that the game is not as good as Virtua Fighter 2. A reviewer for Next Generation similarly said that though Battle Arena Toshinden 2 addresses many of the complaints made about the original game and has impressive light-sourcing effects, backgrounds, and overdrive super moves, it still fails to measure up to Virtua Fighter 2: "The depth of gameplay and complexity of the strategy isn't there, and the speed and smoothness of VF2 far outweighs Toshinden 2s light-sourcing and moving backgrounds. ... The initial 'wow' of the first Toshinden ... is gone and what's left is a fighting game that isn't deep, fast, or balanced enough to compete with the best." The magazine's later review of the arcade version was still less enthusiastic. The reviewer contended that the Toshinden series is not well-suited to the arcade environment, and criticized the fact that the arcade version is near-identical to the PlayStation version, since standards are higher in arcades. Hyper magazine, by contrast, selected as its pick of the month and said, "Although already a favorite on the PlayStation, releasing the long-awaited second game in the arcades seems to give the game extra credibility points." They reported that among interviewed players, "the general consensus seemed to be that the arcade version IS better, i.e. smoother graphic flow, better gameplay, you know, it just feels better."
 	
Maximum'''s Rich Leadbetter argued that the changes from the original game, particularly the new characters Chaos and Vermillion, made the game better, but also felt that they were insufficient, particularly in light of the graphical advances PlayStation games had made since the original Toshinden was released. He concluded by advising PlayStation owners to wait for Tekken 2 instead. GamePro similarly described the game as "more of the same." While the reviewer stated the graphics are better than the first game, he derided the game's lack of intelligent fighting technique, particularly that combos are very limited and the fights essentially boil down to trading special attacks. IGN stated that the game's animations were not very smooth and the camera made gameplay challenging. Final comments on the game stated that although the game wasn't necessarily bad, it wasn't exactly outstanding either.

Reviews for Toshinden URABattle Arena Toshinden URA met with overwhelmingly negative reviews. Critics remarked that despite the game running in high resolution, the enhanced textures over the PlayStation game cause URA to suffer from a generally muddy and choppy appearance. Several reviewers called the new character Ronron one of the worst fighting game characters ever created. Many critics also began to find serious problems in the basic Toshinden gameplay with this installment; Jeff Gerstmann stated in GameSpot that "Though URA has the most features of any Toshinden release to date, it's still like playing the previous Toshinden games. That is to say, the control is sluggish, the combo system is weak, and the special moves are dull." Dan Hsu similarly wrote in Electronic Gaming Monthly, "I look at these games as a novelty now, because it's more flash than technique. The fighters do not have a lot of moves available, and the ones they do have are pretty boring." A reviewer for Next Generation commented, "Any time you can beat the entire game on the hardest difficulty by mashing on one button - with your eyes closed - there's something very wrong." GamePro found it very similar to the previous Saturn entry in the series, Battle Arena Toshinden Remix, and concluded, "Simply put, URA is just more of a bad thing." They gave it a 3.0 out of 5 or lower in every category, including a 0.5 for funfactor. Lee Nutter noted in Sega Saturn Magazine that the game had been given an unusually high level of PAL optimization, but concluded that the mediocre graphics and lack of depth in the gameplay made it a poor buy, particularly with Fighters Megamix soon to be released in PAL regions.

Battle Arena Toshinden 2 PlusBattle Arena Toshinden 2 Plus is a version of Toshinden 2'' released only in Japan for the PlayStation on The Best range (equivalent to the Greatest Hits and Platinum ranges in North America and Europe). It features enhanced graphics, improved control and tweaked CPU AI. It also makes some balancing tweaks to the characters' attacks. An option to save results, option settings and unlocked characters to a memory card was also added.

References

External links
Tamsoft page: BAT2+
Playmates Interactive Entertainment, Incorporated. page
Kinesoft Development Corp. page
Gamebank page
Cyberfront Corporation page

1995 video games
Arcade video games
Capcom games
Kinesoft games
Multiplayer and single-player video games
PlayStation (console) games
PlayStation Portable games
PlayStation Vita games
Sega Saturn games
Takara video games
THQ games
Battle Arena Toshinden
Video game sequels
Video games developed in Japan
Windows games
CyberFront games